

Venue
All matches held at the Supachalasai Stadium in Bangkok, Thailand

Tournament

Round robin tournament

Third Place Match

Final

Winner

Scorers
4 goals
  Mohammed Salem Al-Enazi

3 goals
  Niklas Skoog

2 goals
  Johan Elmander
  Manit Noywech

1 goal
  Back Young-chul
  Jon Yong-chol
  Kim Myong-won
  Kim Yong-jun
  Nam Song-chol
  Hussein Yasser
  Sayed Ali Bechir
  Alexander Farnerud
  Daniel Majstorović
  Markus Johannesson
  Tobias Grahn
  Datsakorn Thonglao
  Narongchai Vachiraban
  Pichitphong Choeichiu
  Sarayuth Chaikamdee
  Therdsak Chaiman

Own goal
  Tanongsak Prajakkata (playing against Sweden)

External links
 King's Cup results RSSSF

King's Cup
International association football competitions hosted by Thailand
Cup